Tyutkovo is a rural locality (a village) in Florishchinskoye Rural Settlement, Kolchuginsky District, Vladimir Oblast, Russia. The population was 7 as of 2010.

Geography 
Tyutkovo is located 26 km northwest of Kolchugino (the district's administrative centre) by road. Bogorodskoye is the nearest rural locality.

References 

Rural localities in Kolchuginsky District